Clarence Wright Stephens (August 19, 1863 – February 28, 1947) was a pitcher for Major League Baseball in the 19th century. He started one game for the Cincinnati Red Stockings in 1886 and one game for the Cincinnati Reds in 1891. Both were complete game appearances, with one win and one loss.

Sources

1863 births
1947 deaths
Baseball players from Ohio
19th-century baseball players
Cincinnati Red Stockings (AA) players
Cincinnati Reds players